Robert J. Meyer (February 9, 1935 – July 14, 1984) was an American politician who served in the New Jersey General Assembly from the 8th Legislative District from 1982 until his death in 1984.

A resident of Medford, New Jersey, he died of a heart attack on July 14, 1984, in Mount Holly, New Jersey at age 49.

References

1935 births
1984 deaths
New Jersey city council members
Republican Party members of the New Jersey General Assembly
People from Medford, New Jersey
Politicians from Burlington County, New Jersey
20th-century American politicians